IFLA Journal is a quarterly peer-reviewed academic journal that covers the fields of librarianship and information science. It publishes original research, case studies, and essays on library and information services and the social, political and economic issues that impact access to information through libraries. The editor-in-chief is Steven Witt (University of Illinois at Urbana–Champaign). It was established in 1975 and is published by SAGE Publications on behalf of the International Federation of Library Associations and Institutions (IFLA).

Abstracting and indexing
The journal is abstracted and indexed in Academic Premier, Compendex, Inspec, Library Information Science Abstracts, Library Literature and Information Science, Scopus, and Sociological Abstracts.

External links

SAGE Publishing academic journals
English-language journals
Library and information science journals
Quarterly journals
Publications established in 1975